Brad Drewett and Kim Warwick were the defending champions, but competed this year with different partners. Drewett teamed up with Mark Edmondson and lost in the first round to Chip Hooper and Mike Leach, while Warwick teamed up with Steve Denton and also lost in the first round to Scott Davis and David Pate.

Mike De Palmer and Gary Donnelly won the title by defeating Pat Cash and Mark Kratzmann 7–6, 6–7, 7–5 in the final.

Seeds

Draw

Draw

References

External links
 Official results archive (ATP)
 Official results archive (ITF)

Hong Kong Open (tennis)
Singles